Afoninskaya is a rural locality (a village) in Shelotskoye Rural Settlement, Verkhovazhsky District, Vologda Oblast, Russia. The population was 15 as of 2002.

Geography 
The distance to Verkhovazhye is 70.5 km, to Shelota is 1 km. Petrakovskaya is the nearest rural locality.

References 

Rural localities in Verkhovazhsky District